Parish council elections took place across Rushcliffe's parishes on 2 May 2019, alongside local elections in the borough.

Background
Parish councils are the lowest tier of local government in England. Elections to these bodies are usually non-partisan, with most councillors sitting as independents. Where there are an equal number or fewer candidates than there are vacancies, all candidates are elected unopposed, and no poll is taken. If a poll is necessary, voting is done under the plurality block voting system in most cases, unless the parish is split into wards with a ward electing one councillor, in which case first-past-the-post voting is used.

Rushcliffe is divided into 39 parish councils (two are styled as town councils), with the former West Bridgford Urban District being unparished. All of these cover a single parish, excluding Holme Pierrepont and Gamston Parish Council, and Wysall and Thorpe in the Glebe Parish Council, which cover two. In addition, the borough has 17 parish meetings, in which a meeting of all electors acts as the parish council. These therefore held no elections. They are; Car Colston, Clipston on the Wolds, Elton on the Hill, Flawborough, Hawksworth, Kneeton, Owthorpe, Ratcliffe-on-Soar, Saxondale, Scarrington, Screveton, Shelton, Sibthorpe, Thoroton, Thrumpton, Tithby and Wiverton (covering two parishes), and West Leake.

Results
A total of 292 seats were elected. Polls took place in five parish councils (only one of the two wards in Bingham was contested). Independents won 260 seats, the Conservatives won 18, Labour won 12, and the Liberal Democrats and Green Party won 1 seat each.

Results by council

Aslockton (uncontested)

Barton-in-Fabis (uncontested)

Bingham

Bradmore (uncontested)

Bunny (uncontested)

Colston Bassett (uncontested)

Costock (uncontested)

Cotgrave (uncontested)

Cropwell Bishop (uncontested)

Cropwell Butler (uncontested)

East Bridgford (uncontested)

East Leake

Flintham (uncontested)

Gotham (uncontested)

Granby cum Sutton (uncontested)

Hickling (uncontested)

Holme Pierrepont and Gamston

Gamston (uncontested)

Holme Pierrepont (uncontested)

Keyworth (uncontested)

Kingston on Soar (uncontested)

Kinoulton (uncontested)

Langar cum Barnstone (uncontested)

Newton (uncontested)

Normanton on Soar (uncontested)

Normanton-on-the-Wolds (uncontested)

Orston (uncontested)

Plumtree (uncontested)

Radcliffe-on-Trent (uncontested)

Rempstone

Ruddington (uncontested)

Shelford (uncontested)

Stanford on Soar (uncontested)

Stanton-on-the-Wolds

Sutton Bonington

Tollerton (uncontested)

Upper Broughton (uncontested)

Whatton-in-the-Vale (uncontested)

Widmerpool (uncontested)

Willoughby on the Wolds (uncontested)

Wysall and Thorpe in the Glebe

Thorpe in the Glebe (uncontested)

Wysall (uncontested)

References

Parish councils of England
May 2019 events in the United Kingdom
Elections in Nottinghamshire